Razdolnoye is a rural locality (a selo) and the administrative center of Razdolnensky Selsoviet, Rodinsky District, Altai Krai, Russia. The population was 835 as of 2013. There are 10 streets.

Geography 
Razdolnoye is located 21 km west of Rodino (the district's administrative centre) by road. Markovka and Rodino are the nearest rural localities.

References 

Rural localities in Rodinsky District